Alfredo Juraidini Riloba (born 19 September 1994) is a Mexican professional footballer who plays as a right-back. Mexican at birth, Juraidini also obtained Lebanese citizenship through his origins.

Club career
Juraidini made his professional debut with Puebla against Altamira on 7 August 2013. He scored his first goal with the club in the Clausura 2014 Copa MX against Atletico San Luis, on 2 February 2014. After trialing with River Plate Asunción, Juraidini signed for the club. The player returned to Puebla on 1 July 2016. Juraidini moved on a short-term loan to Potros UAEM during the 2018 Ascenso MX Clausura.

On 16 January 2019, Juraidini moved to Lebanese Premier League side Salam Zgharta to compete in the second leg of the 2018–19 season. On 28 August 2019, he joined Ansar on a one-year contract for the 2019–20 season.

On 5 September 2020, Juraidini moved back to Mexico, joining Atlético Capitalino in the newly formed Liga de Balompié Mexicano. He returned to Lebanon on 17 January 2021, joining Shabab Sahel to play in the second half of the 2020–21 season. In 2022, he played for Tlaxcala.

Honours
Puebla
 Copa Pachuca: 2013
 Copa MX: 2015
 Supercopa MX: 2015

References

External links
 
 
 
 
 
 
 
 
 Alfredo Juraidini at Club Puebla

1993 births
Living people
Mexican people of Lebanese descent
Lebanese people of Mexican descent
Sportspeople of Lebanese descent
People from Teziutlán
Footballers from Puebla
Association football fullbacks
Club Puebla players
River Plate (Asunción) footballers
Salam Zgharta FC players
Al Ansar FC players
Atlético Capitalino players
Shabab Al Sahel FC players
Potros UAEM footballers
Tlaxcala F.C. players
Liga MX players
Liga de Balompié Mexicano players
Ascenso MX players
Lebanese Premier League players
Mexican expatriate footballers
Mexican expatriate sportspeople in Paraguay
Expatriate footballers in Paraguay
Mexican footballers